Morrison High School, or MHS, is a public four-year high school located at 643 Genesee Avenue in Morrison, Illinois, a small city of Whiteside County, Illinois, in the Midwestern United States. MHS is part of Morrison Community Unit School District 6, which serves the community of Morrison, and includes Morrison Junior High School, and Northside Elementary School, and Southside Elementary School. The campus is 13 miles west of Sterling, Illinois. The school serves a mixed small city, village, and rural residential community. The school lies within the Sterling micropolitan statistical area.

Academics

In 2009, Morrison High School did not make Adequate Yearly Progress, with 57% of students meeting standards, on the Prairie State Achievement Examination, a state test that is part of the No Child Left Behind Act. The school's average high school graduation rate between 1999-2009 was 93%.

The school offers courses in the following academic departments:
Math
English
Social Studies
Science
Business
Consumer Science
Art
Music
Agriculture
Physical Education
Foreign Language
Miscellaneous

Athletics
Morrison High School competes in the Three Rivers Conference and is a member school in the Illinois High School Association. Its mascot is the Mustangs (boys) and Fillies (girls). The school has 4 state championships on record in team athletics or activities, Boys Track and Field in 2006 (3rd place)  Boys Football in 2009-2010 and 2011–2012, and Girls Softball in 2010–2011.

Notable alumni
 John R. Huizenga, professor of chemistry and physics, participated in the Manhattan Project, elected to the National Academy of Sciences

References

External links
 Morrison High School
 Morrison Community Unit School District 6

Public high schools in Illinois
Schools in Whiteside County, Illinois